The 104th Regiment of Foot was a regiment raised by the East India Company and placed on the British establishment as in 1862.

104th Regiment of Foot may also refer to:
104th Regiment of Foot (King's Volunteers), raised in 1761
104th Regiment of Foot (1782)
104th Regiment of Foot (Royal Manchester Volunteers), raised in 1794
104th (New Brunswick) Regiment of Foot, raised in Canada and placed on the British establishment in 1810

See also
 104th Regiment (disambiguation)